Shipley, Oregon is an unincorporated community in Yamhill County, Oregon, United States. Most of the area has been annexed by the city of Sheridan.

Location
Shipley is located at the intersection of Oregon Route 18 Business and Rock Creek Road on the western end of Sheridan. Rock Creek road travels to the Delphi Schools. Willamina is located to the west. It sits at 213 feet above sea level in the Yamhill Valley along the South Yamhill River. The ZIP Code for Shipley is 97378.

References

Sheridan, Oregon
Neighborhoods in Oregon
Unincorporated communities in Yamhill County, Oregon
Unincorporated communities in Oregon